is a Japanese actor.

Ikeda is represented with Hori Agency. He performed in the stage play Crazy Honey (produced and directed by Yukiko Motoya) and made his debut in the entertainment industry in 2011. Ikeda made regular appearances in the 2013 Nichiyō Gekijō series Andō Lloyd: A.I. knows Love?

On 12 January 2017, it was announced that he married Sekai no Owari member Saori.

Filmography

TV dramas

Films

Stage

Advertisements

Music videos

References

External links
 
 

Male actors from Kanagawa Prefecture
1986 births
Living people